Scylla is a 12,956-foot-elevation (3,949 meter) mountain summit located west of the crest of the Sierra Nevada mountain range, in Fresno County, California, United States. The John Muir Trail provides one possible approach option to this remote peak. An ascent of the peak is non-technical via the northwest slope, and inclusion on the Sierra Peaks Section peakbagging list generates climbing interest in this peak.

History
This mountain's name refers to Scylla, a metamorphic monster in Greek mythology who lives on one side of a narrow channel of water, opposite her counterpart Charybdis. The two sides of the strait are so close that sailors attempting to avoid Charybdis would pass dangerously close to Scylla and vice versa. The name was applied in 1895 by Theodore Solomons and Ernest C. Bonner. Solomons wrote of Enchanted Gorge: "At half-past one this gorge lay directly south of us, and in an hour we had descended to its head, which we found was guarded by a nearby frozen lake, whose sheer, ice-smoothed walls arose on either side, up and up, seemingly into the very sky, their crowns two sharp black peaks of most majestic form. A Scylla and Charybdis they seemed to us, as we stood at the margin of the lake and wondered how we might pass the dangerous portal." The toponym was officially adopted in 1964 by the United States Board on Geographic Names.

The first ascent of the summit was made July 3, 1934, by David Brower and Hervey Voge.

Climate
Scylla is located in an alpine climate zone. Most weather fronts originate in the Pacific Ocean, and travel east toward the Sierra Nevada mountains. As fronts approach, they are forced upward by the peaks (orographic lift), causing them to drop their moisture in the form of rain or snowfall onto the range. Precipitation runoff from this mountain drains into Goddard Creek which is a tributary of the Middle Fork Kings River.

See also
 
 Sequoia-Kings Canyon Wilderness

References

External links
 Weather forecast: Scylla

Mountains of Fresno County, California
Mountains of Kings Canyon National Park
North American 3000 m summits
Mountains of Northern California
Sierra Nevada (United States)